

Places
Norbury may refer to these places in England:
Norbury, Cheshire
Norbury, Derbyshire
Norbury Manor, a Tudor-period manor house there
Norbury, Greater Manchester
Norbury, London
Norbury, Shropshire
Norbury, Staffordshire

or to Norbury, Saskatchewan, in Rural Municipality of Spiritwood No. 496#Urban communities, Canada

People
Victor Norbury (1887 – 1972), Hampshire and Lancashire cricketer, and Southampton F.C. footballer
Earls of Norbury